Lambach a market town in the Wels-Land district of Upper Austria.

Lambach may also refer to:

Lambach, Moselle, a commune in the Moselle department in north-eastern France
Lambach (Loper Bach), a river of North Rhine-Westphalia, Germany, tributary of the Loper Bach
Lambach (Eickumer Mühlenbach), a river of North Rhine-Westphalia, Germany, tributary of the Eickumer Mühlenbach
Lambach Abbey, a Benedictine monastery in Lambach in the Wels-Land district of Upper Austria
Lambach HL.I, a trainer aircraft designed and built by the Delft Student Aeroclub in the Netherlands in the 1930s
Lambach HL.II, a single seat aerobatic biplane designed and built in the Netherlands in the 1930s
SSVOBB "Lambach Aircraft", an aircraft designed and built by the SSVOBB (Foundation for Students in Airplane development, manufacturing and management) in the Netherlands
Helmut Lambach (1918–2000), Hauptmann in the Wehrmacht during World War II